Jamie Ball (born 1 September 1979) is a South African former professional racing cyclist. In 2009 he won the South African National Road Race Championships.

Major results
2005
 3rd Overall Tour d'Egypte
1st Stages 3 (TTT), 5 & 7
 4th Road race, National Road Championships
2009
 1st  Road race, National Road Championships
 2nd Overall UCI Africa Tour
 7th Overall La Tropicale Amissa Bongo
2010
 1st Stage 3 Tour de Filipinas

References

External links
 

1979 births
Living people
South African male cyclists
Sportspeople from Pretoria
White South African people